Giedrius Staniulis (born April 16, 1991) is a professional Lithuanian basketball player for BC Gargždai-SC of the Lithuanian Basketball League (LKL). He mainly plays the power forward position, but can also play small forward.

International career 
Staniulis represented the Lithuanian youth squads twice. He won bronze medal with the U-16 National Team in 2007 FIBA Europe Under-16 Championship and  silver medal with the U-18 National Team in 2008 FIBA Europe Under-18 Championship.

References 

1991 births
Living people
Lithuanian men's basketball players
Power forwards (basketball)
Small forwards
Basketball players from Kaunas